Bruno Nahuel Suárez Pereyra (born 2 June 2000) is a Uruguayan professional footballer who plays as a goalkeeper.

International career
Suárez is a former Uruguayan youth national team player.

Career statistics

Honours
Uruguay U20
 South American Games silver medal: 2018

References

External links

2000 births
Living people
Defensor Sporting players
Atenas de San Carlos players
C.A. Progreso players
Uruguayan Primera División players
Uruguayan footballers
Uruguay youth international footballers
Association football goalkeepers
South American Games silver medalists for Uruguay
South American Games medalists in football